The A1 Autoroute, also known as l'autoroute du Nord (the Northern Motorway), is the busiest of France's autoroutes. It is managed by the Société des Autoroutes du Nord et de l'Est de la France (SANEF). The autoroute serves the northern suburbs of Paris, including the Stade de France, Le Bourget, Paris' Roissy Charles de Gaulle Airport, and Parc Astérix. From there it crosses Picardy, without directly passing through any of the major cities of the région. Throughout Picardy, the A1 runs parallel to the LGV Nord.

Around  from Paris, between the towns of Amiens and Saint-Quentin and near the Aire de service d'Assevillers (the largest motorway plaza in Europe), the A1 crosses over the A29. A few dozen kilometers further north it forms the southern terminus of the A2, which branches off towards Brussels. The A1 is also crossed by the A26 and the A21, and it makes up part of European routes E15, E17, and E19. At its northern terminus, the A1 turns into the A25.

History
 Lille (porte de la Madeleine) - Carvin: 1954
 Carvin - Gavrelle: 1958
 Gavrelle - Bapaume: 1967
 Bapaume - Roye: 1966
 Roye - Senlis: 1965
 Senlis - Le Bourget: 1964
 Le Bourget - Saint-Denis: 1966
 Saint-Denis - Paris (porte de la Chapelle): 1965.

List of exits and junctions

European Routes

External links

Autoroute A1 in Saratlas
A1 autoroute data and images

A01 France
Transport infrastructure in Île-de-France
Transport in Hauts-de-France
Picardy